Francis Lodowic Bartels (13 March 1910 – 20 March 2010) was a Ghanaian diplomat and educationalist, who served as Ghana's ambassador to West Germany between 1970 and 1972.

Biography 
Francis Bartels was born in Cape Coast to the Rev. Charles Henry Bartels (1885–1938), a Methodist minister, and Agnes Mensah (1887–1940). He stems from a prominent Gold Coast Euro-African family from Elmina. Carel Hendrik Bartels was his great-great-grandfather. One of his daughters is the Ghanaian diplomat, Agnes Aggrey-Orleans.

Bartels attended the Mfantsipim School between 1925 and 1928 and the Wesley College of Education, Kumasi between 1929 and 1931. A King Edward VII Scholarship allowed him to continue his studies at King's College London, where he graduated in 1935 with a Bachelor of Arts. He then returned to the Gold Coast to teach at the Mfantsipim School. Between 1946 and 1947, Bartels studied teaching at the  University College London and subsequently taught at the Selly Oak Colleges in Birmingham. After he received a Master of Arts there, Bartels again returned to the Gold Coast, to become the first Euro-African President of the Mfantsipim School.

In 1989 he was awarded an honorary doctorate in law (LL.D.) from the University of Ghana. He was a founding member of the Mfantsipim Lodge of the District Grand Lodge of Ghana.

He died in Paris a week after his 100th birthday.

Publications 
Mfantse nkasafua dwumadzi; a Fante grammar of function (1946)
The Beginning of Africanisation: the dawn of the missionary motive in Gold Coast education, Rev. Thomas Thompson, 1751–1951 (1951)
Philip Quaque, 1741–1816 (1955)
Jacobus Eliza Johannes Capitein, 1717–47 (1959)
The roots of Ghana Methodism (1965)
Akan indigenous education (1975)
Trends in Innovation: Basic Education in Africa (1981)
The Persistence of Paradox: Memoirs of F. L. Bartels (2003)
Journey out of the African maze: indigenous and higher education in tandem (2007)

References 

1910 births
2010 deaths
Ghanaian centenarians
Ghanaian diplomats
Fante people
Men centenarians
Mfantsipim School alumni
Ghanaian Freemasons
Ghanaian people of German descent